St. Mary's County may refer to:

St. Mary's County, Maryland
St. Mary's County, Utah Territory, now part of Nevada